2020 in cycling included the following:

2020 in men's road cycling
2020 in women's road cycling